Glyphidocera rhypara is a moth in the family Autostichidae. It was described by Walsingham in 1911. It is found in Mexico (Sonora, Guerrero).

The wingspan is 14–15 mm. The forewings are pale fawn-ochreous, minutely dusted with fuscous. A fuscous spot near the base on the upper edge of the fold is succeeded by a second spot in the middle of the fold, a third lying in the disc above and a little beyond it. A fourth spot at the end of the cell is produced downwards to its lower angle somewhat obliquely inward. A slight fuscous shade occurs along the termen and at the apex, and is reduplicated in the middle of the pale fawn-ochreous cilia. The hindwings are pale cinereous.

References

Moths described in 1911
Glyphidocerinae